The 1907 Ottawa Rough Riders finished in 3rd place in the newly formed Interprovincial Rugby Football Union with a 2–4 record and failed to qualify for the playoffs.

Regular season

Standings

Schedule

References

Ottawa Rough Riders seasons
1907 in Ontario
1907 in Canadian sports
1907 in rugby union